The 1980–81 Dallas Mavericks season was the first season of the franchise in the National Basketball Association (NBA).

Expansion Draft

Draft picks

 Kiki Vandeweghe of UCLA was drafted by the Mavs with the 11th pick of the 1980 NBA Draft, but Vandeweghe refused to play for the expansion Mavericks and staged a holdout that lasted a month into the team's inaugural season. Vandeweghe was traded to the Denver Nuggets, along with a first-round pick in 1981, in exchange for two future first-round picks

Roster

Regular season

Season standings

Notes
 z, y – division champions
 x – clinched playoff spot

Record vs. opponents

Game log

Player statistics

Awards and records

Awards

Records

Transactions

Trades

Free agents

Additions

Subtractions

See also
 1980–81 NBA season

References

Dallas Mavericks seasons
Da
Dallas
Dallas